Chong Heihu (Chinese: 崇黑虎; Pinyin: Chóng Hēihǔ; Heihu literally means black tiger) is a character featured within the famed classic Chinese novel Fengshen Yanyi. He is the younger brother of Chong Houhu, the Grand Duke of the North. 

In appearance, Chong Heihu could be seen wearing a Nine-Cloud-Burning-Flame helmet equipped with a jade belt, a bright red robe, and golden chain mail. With a long red beard, eyes like two golden bells, and duel golden axes by his side, Chong Heihu was a feared man of great prowess. 

At the time of Chong Houhu's third desperate retreat, Chong Heihu would come from the Cao region with three thousand flying tiger soldiers to assist. In time, Chong Heihu, along with his elder brother, would approach the Ji province's city gate. However, Chong Heihu solely wished to talk matters through with his old friend, Su Hu. Su Hu's son, Su Quanzhong would appear before Chong Heihu and bark words of malcontent. Thus, Chong Heihu lifted his legendary golden axes to show Quanzhong his place. Through their battle, Chong Heihu was immensely surprised at the skill of Quanzhong with his spear. Chong Heihu would thus retreat, and Quanzhong pursued with persistence. However, Chong Heihu used this chance to unleash the legendary magical gourd from his back (a gourd previously given to him by a superiorman). Black smoke spewed forth even covering the entire sun in an instant. While summoning a sacred eagle as well, Chong Heihu would knock Quanzhong from his horse and effectively capture him.

Some time following this point, the renowned crow commander Zheng Lun would appear before Chong Heihu's camp and ask for battle. Chong Heihu would retort with the words, "Man! How dare you made such bold speech? Your master, having rebelled against the king, will have his body broken and his bones powdered. You, my friend, will enjoy the same fate!" Thus Chong Heihu would exert his full renown within his battle against Zheng Lun. Zheng Lun, a great man destined to be a god, easily realized that Chong Heihu's large gourd was full of magic potential, and he would thus exert two large jets of smoke from his nostrils which would knock Chong Heihu from his saddle, unconscious. Once captured, Chong Heihu would drink with his old friend, Su Hu. Once Ji Chang took action and ended the coalition with a simple letter, Chong Heihu would head back to his region after expressing his immense respect and gratitude.

Chong Heihu was appointed as the deity of Nanyue Emperor (南岳大帝) in the end.

Notes

References
 Investiture of the Gods Chapter 3

Investiture of the Gods characters